Hard Boiled is a 1992 Hong Kong action film directed by John Woo.

Hard boiled or hardboiled or hard-boiled  may also refer to:

Films
 Hard Boiled (1919 film), a 1919 American silent comedy film directed by Victor Schertzinger
 Hard Boiled (1926 film), a 1926 American silent western film 
 Hard Boiled Mahoney, a 1947 film starring the comedy team of The Bowery Boys
 The Last Blood (1991 film), aka Hard Boiled 2; a Hong Kong action film

Other uses
 Hard-boiled eggs, a type of cooked egg
 Hardboiled, a style of fiction pioneered in the mid-1920s
 Hard Boiled (Bakufu Slump album)
 Hard Boiled (comics), a 1990–1992 three-issue comic book mini-series written by Frank Miller and drawn by Geof Darrow
 Stranglehold (videogame), aka Hard Boiled 2; videogame sequel to the 1992 HK action film

See also

 
 
 Boil (disambiguation)
 Hard (disambiguation)